Björn Emil Oscar Nyberg (11 September 1929 – 16 November 2004), was a Swedish fantasy author best known for his additions to the series of Conan stories begun by Robert E. Howard. His primary contribution to the series was The Return of Conan (1957), which was revised for publication by L. Sprague de Camp. He lived in France.

Bibliography

Conan series

Books
The Return of Conan (1957) (with L. Sprague de Camp)
Conan the Avenger (collection) (1968) (with Robert E. Howard and L. Sprague de Camp)
Conan the Swordsman (collection) (1978) (with L. Sprague de Camp and Lin Carter)
Sagas of Conan (collection) (2004) (with Lin Carter and L. Sprague de Camp)

Short stories
"The People of the Summit" (1970) (revised 1978, with L. Sprague de Camp)
"The Star of Khorala" (1978) (with L. Sprague de Camp)

Other fiction

Short stories
"Väktaren" (1958 - Swedish only)
"The Agent" (1959)

Non-fiction
"Conan and Myself," in ERBania 6, January 1959.

References

External links

1929 births
2004 deaths
Swedish fantasy writers
Swedish male writers
L. Sprague de Camp
20th-century Swedish novelists
Conan the Barbarian novelists